Voglibose (INN and USAN, trade name Voglib, marketed by Mascot Health Series) is an alpha-glucosidase inhibitor used for lowering postprandial blood glucose levels in people with diabetes mellitus. Voglibose delays the absorption of glucose thereby reducing the risk of macrovascular complications. Voglibose is a research product of Takeda Pharmaceutical Company, Japan's largest pharmaceutical company. Vogilbose was discovered in 1981, and was first launched in Japan in 1994, under the trade name BASEN, to improve postprandial hyperglycemia in diabetes mellitus.

Postprandial hyperglycemia (PPHG) is primarily due to first phase insulin secretion. Alpha glucosidase inhibitors delay glucose absorption at the intestine level and thereby prevent sudden surge of glucose after a meal.

There are three major drugs which belong to this class, acarbose, miglitol and voglibose, of which voglibose is the newest.

References

Further reading 
  
 

Alpha-glucosidase inhibitors
Amino sugars